Rupa may refer to:

Places
Rupa, Croatia, a town in northwest Croatia
Rupa, Arunachal Pradesh, a town of Arunachal Pradesh
Rupa gold mine, an artisanal mine in Uganda
Rupa Lake, a freshwater lake in Nepal

Science
Rupa (beetle), a beetle genus established by Jedkicka in 1935
Rupa (wasp), a wasp genus established by Jonathan in 1971

Other 
 Rūpa, Devanagari for "form", with specific meanings in various religious contexts
RUPA, or Rugby Union Players Association, the representative body for professional rugby union players in Australia
Rupa & Co. an Indian publishing company
Rupa Company, chaddi baniyan manufacturer 
Revised Uniform Partnership Act, a United States law
Rupa (name), a given name

See also